"Come, Come, Ye Saints" (originally "All is Well") is one of the best-known Latter-day Saint hymns. The lyrics were written in 1846 by Mormon poet William Clayton.  The hymn has been called the anthem of the nineteenth-century Mormon pioneers.

Clayton wrote the hymn "All is Well" on April 15, 1846, as his Mormon pioneer caravan rested at Locust Creek, Iowa, over 100 miles west of its origin city of Nauvoo, Illinois. Just prior to writing the lyrics, Clayton had received word that one of his wives, Diantha, had given birth to a healthy boy in Nauvoo. It was set to the music of a popular English folk tune, "All is Well."

The hymn was renamed "Come, Come, Ye Saints" and is hymn number 30 in the current LDS Church hymnal. A men's arrangement of the hymn is number 326 of the same hymnal. "Come, Come, Ye Saints" features prominently in celebrations of Pioneer Day in Utah and in performances of the Tabernacle Choir at Temple Square.

The hymn also appears in a Protestant hymnal, the United Church of Christ's New Century Hymnal, with alternate lyrics for the LDS-oriented third verse written by lyricist Avis B. Christianson. Another version by Joseph F. Green is contained in the Seventh-day Adventist Hymnal.

Lyrics

Notes

References

External links
 "Pioneer Story: Locust Creek", churchofjesuschrist.org
 "Come, Come, Ye Saints", churchofjesuschrist.org, words and music
 Free MP3 download

Latter Day Saint hymns
Mormon migration to Utah
North American anthems
1846 poems
1846 in Christianity
Works by William Clayton (Mormon)